Checkmat is an international Brazilian Jiu-Jitsu association and team, headquartered in Long Beach, California, USA. It was founded in 2008 by Leo Vieira, who leads Checkmat with his brothers Ricardo Vieira and Leandro Vieira. Checkmat currently has affiliate academies around the world including in Brazil, United Kingdom, Canada, Poland, Madagascar, Cyprus, Sweden, Ireland, England, Malaysia, the United States, Paraguay, Spain, France, Denmark, The Netherlands, Iceland, Finland, Greece, Germany, China, Japan, Korea, Singapore, Tunisia, the Philippines, Australia, Argentina, Kazakhstan and Ukraine.

The name "Checkmat" is derived from the chess term "checkmate" and the word "mat", being the surface on which Brazilian Jiu-Jitsu is usually practiced. The Vieira brothers saw similarities in the strategic and tactical nature of chess and Brazilian Jiu-Jitsu.

Checkmat's record

2021
1st Place - IBJJF Worlds

2013
1st Place - European Open Championship Female
3rd Place - European Open Championship Master & Senior
3rd Place - European Open Championship Novice
2nd Place - World Jiu Jitsu Championship Adult Male
2nd Place - World Jiu Jitsu Championship Adult Female

2012
1st Place - Pan Kids Championship
2nd Place - Pan Championship
3rd Place - World Championship Novice
3rd Place - World Championship Female
1st Place - European Open Championship Female
2nd Place - European Open Championship Adult
3rd Place - European Open Championship Master & Senior
3rd Place - European Open Championship Novice
3rd Place - Brazilian National Female
3rd Place - Brazilian National Adult

2011
1st Place - World No-Gi Championship
2nd Place - World Championship
1st Place - Brazilian National Female
2nd Place - Brazilian National Adult
3rd Place - European Open Championship Adult
1st Place - European Open Championship Female
1st Place - European Open Championship Master & Senior
2nd Place - European Open Championship Novice

2010
2nd Place - No-Gi World Championship Adult
2nd Place - No-Gi World Championship Female
3rd Place - World Championship
2nd Place - European Open Championship Adult
1st Place - European Open Championship Master & Senior
3rd Place - European Open Championship Novice

2009
1st Place - No-Gi World Championship 
3rd Place - World Championship 
1st Place - European Open Championship Adult
2nd Place - European Open Championship Master & Senior
3rd Place - European Open Championship Novice

2008
1st Place - No-Gi World Champions

Notable fighters
 Leo Vieira
 Ricardo Vieira
 Leandro Vieira
 Leka Vieira
 Marcus Almeida
 João Assis
 Lucas Leite
 Marcel Louzado
 Marcelo Mafra
 Michelle Nicolini
 Cláudio Silva
 Jackson Sousa

Recent major achievements 
 World Jiu-Jitsu No-Gi Championship 2008 - Adult Team champions
 World Jiu-Jitsu No-Gi Championship 2009 - Adult Team champions
 World Jiu-Jitsu No-Gi Championship 2010 - Adult Team 2nd Place
 Brazilian Nationals No-gi Championship 2009 - Third place
 European Brazilian Jiu-Jitsu Championship 2009 - Adult Team Champions
 Brazilian Team Title 2008 – First
 Brazilian Beginners Championship 2008 – Second
 Rio International Open 2008 – Second
 Rio International Open 2009 – First
 South American Championship 2008 – First
 Brazilian Nationals 2009 - Second place
 Brazilian Nationals 2010 - Adult Team Champions
 European Brazilian Jiu-Jitsu Championship 2010 -Second place
 World Championships 2009 - Third Place
 World Championships 2010 - Third Place
 Brazilian Nationals 2010 No-Gi - Adult Team Champions
 World Championships 2011 - Second Place
 Brazilian Nationals 2011 - Second Place
 European Open Championship 2011 - Third Place
 World Jiu-Jitsu No-Gi Championship 2011 -Adult Team Champions, Senior & Master Champions
 European Open Championship 2012 - Adult second place

References

External links 

Checkmat BJJ Heroes Page
Official Vieira Bros Web Site
CheckMat Website
International Brazilian Jiu-Jitsu Federation Website
Impact MMA (Checkmat Singapore) website
Checkmat MARanking profile Statistics and BJJ (GI) main titles since 2004

Brazilian jiu-jitsu organizations